Inglewood is a town in Buffalo City in the Eastern Cape province of South Africa.

References

Populated places in Buffalo City Metropolitan Municipality